Filip Kusić (born 3 June 1996) is a Serbian professional footballer who plays as a centre-back for  club FSV Zwickau.

References

External links
 
 Filip Kusić on FuPa.net

1996 births
Living people
Footballers from Munich
Serbian footballers
Serbia youth international footballers
German footballers
German people of Serbian descent
Association football defenders
FC Energie Cottbus II players
FC Oberlausitz Neugersdorf players
1. FC Köln II players
1. FC Köln players
FC Erzgebirge Aue players
Türkgücü München players
FSV Zwickau players
Bundesliga players
2. Bundesliga players
3. Liga players
Regionalliga players